Nigel Nestor is an Irish former sportsperson. He played Gaelic football with his local club Blackhall Gaels and was a member of the Meath county team which won the 1999 All-Ireland Senior Football Championship Final, beating Cork, He was also part of the Meath team that reached the 2001 All-Ireland Senior Football Championship Final, losing to Galway. He was also part of the Meath team that lost the NFL in 2000, losing to Derry team.

References

1974 births
Living people
Blackhall Gaels Gaelic footballers
Gaelic football backs
Meath inter-county Gaelic footballers
Winners of one All-Ireland medal (Gaelic football)